Elpadaro F. Electronica Allah (born Timothy Elpadaro Thedford; September 19, 1976), known professionally as Jay Electronica (stylized as  ), is an American rapper and record producer. Born and raised in New Orleans, he first received widespread attention in 2007, after the release of his mixtape, Act I: Eternal Sunshine (The Pledge). Its success along with the stand-alone single "Exhibit C" subsequently led New York rapper Jay-Z to sign Electronica to his record label, Roc Nation in 2010. His debut studio album, A Written Testimony was released in March 2020 and followed up by Act II: The Patents of Nobility (The Turn) in October of the same year.

Musical career 
In 2007, Jay Electronica released his first mixtape, Act I: Eternal Sunshine (The Pledge), via MySpace. It was downloaded over 50,000 times. That success and his catalog led to Electronica joining the Rock the Bells Tour in 2008.

Later that year, producer Just Blaze and Jay Electronica selected songs for Guitar Center's GAIN project, Fresh Cuts Vol. 3 and included a (previously unnamed) song  which Just Blaze named "Exhibit A (Transformations)."

Just Blaze would later (October 27, 2009) debut "Exhibit C" on Tony Touch's Sirius Radio program, where it quickly caught on, making its way to terrestrial radio stations like New York's Hot 97 and spawning artist remixes from MCs AZ, N.O.R.E, Saigon, Joell Ortiz and others.

A bidding war ensued with Jay finally signing (November 12, 2010) with Roc Nation. Though fans and critics anticipated a full-length debut, Electronica's output in the subsequent decade consisted of several collaborations and non-album solo songs.

On February 7, 2020, Jay Electronica announced via Twitter the completion of his album, A Written Testimony, which was recorded over a 40-day period. It was released on March 13, 2020.

On October 5, 2020, Jay Electronica announced via Twitter that his previously unreleased album, Act II: The Patents of Nobility (The Turn), was available for streaming on Tidal after the album had surfaced online two days prior.

In August 2021, Jay Electronica was featured on the song "Jesus Lord" released on Kanye West's album Donda.

Personal life 

Jay Electronica and Erykah Badu were in a relationship for five years and have a daughter together, Mars Merkaba Thedford, who was born in 2009.

Jay Electronica had an affair with Kate Emma Rothschild, the wife of Benjamin Goldsmith, resulting in the breakdown of Goldsmith's marriage.

Controversy
Jay Electronica is a registered member  of the Nation of Islam, follower of Louis Farrakhan and sampled him on A Written Testimony. One track from the album includes a reference to the “Synagogue of Satan”, a phrase pulled from Revelation 2:9 often considered as an antisemitic slur. As a result, Electronica has been accused of antisemitism.

Discography 

 A Written Testimony (2020)

Awards and nominations

References

External links 

 - Old official web site (2004–2005)
Jay Electronica video interview on redbullmusicacademy.com
Just Blaze, Jay Electronica, & Mike "Chav" Chavarria – An Interview with Jay, Chav, & Just Blaze
Exclaim! magazine interview with Jay Electronica-Exclaim!

1976 births
Living people
St. Augustine High School (New Orleans) alumni
African-American male rappers
African-American record producers
American expatriates in the United Kingdom
American hip hop record producers
Five percenters
Members of the Nation of Islam
Rappers from New Orleans
J
Southern hip hop musicians
Songwriters from Louisiana
21st-century American rappers
Erykah Badu
African-American songwriters
Converts to Islam
African American–Jewish relations